Pristimantis infraguttatus is a species of frog in the family Strabomantidae. Endemic to Peru, it has been discovered in only two localities in the Rioja Province of San Martín Region; it occurs in the Alto Mayo Protection Forest. All known individuals were found on leaves on low vegetation less than a meter above the ground in humid forest at night. Reproduction is by direct development. It is threatened by habitat loss.

References

infraguttatus
Amphibians of Peru
Endemic fauna of Peru
Amphibians described in 1999
Taxonomy articles created by Polbot